Dialogue is the debut studio album by British electronic musician Kieran Hebden, released under his alias Four Tet on February 1, 1999.

Track listing
"The Space of Two Weeks" – 5:50
"Chiron" – 5:23
"Alambradas" – 1:55
"3.3 Degrees from the Pole" – 6:00
"Misnomer" – 3:20
"Liquefaction" – 4:58
"She Scanned" – 3:12
"Calamine" – 7:38
"The Butterfly Effect" – 6:21
"Aying" (CD only) – 4:56
"Fume" (CD only) – 9:53
"Charm" (CD only) – 5:04

References

External links

Four Tet albums
1999 debut albums
Albums produced by Kieran Hebden